Aloeides arida, the arid copper, is a butterfly of the family Lycaenidae. It is found in South Africa, where it is known from the northern Western Cape to Springbok and Steinkopf in the Northern Cape.

The wingspan is 26–32 mm for males and 29–35 mm females. Adults are on wing from September to April, with a peak from December to February. There are multiple generations during midsummer.

References

Butterflies described in 1968
Aloeides
Endemic butterflies of South Africa